Sami Rähmönen (born 19 April 1987 Turku) is a Finnish retired footballer who represented Turun Palloseura in his whole career. He mostly played as a right back, but was also useful as a winger or central midfielder.

33-year-old Rähmönen retired at the end of 2020.

References

 Guardian Football
 Veikkausliiga - Hall of Fame

External links
 
 Guardian's Stats Centre

1987 births
Living people
Footballers from Turku
Finnish footballers
Turun Palloseura footballers
Veikkausliiga players
Finnish people of Moroccan descent
Association football defenders